Frederator Networks, Inc. is a media company founded by Fred Seibert. It makes and distributes cartoons, often on Channel Frederator, and through its in-house animation studio Frederator Studios. It is the largest distributor of independent animation online.

On October 26, 2016, Canadian animation studio Rainmaker Entertainment acquired Frederator Networks, Inc. Rainmaker subsequently rebranded as Wow Unlimited Media.

Partnered content

Fin Punch/Personas Cetaceas
In February 2015, Frederator Networks acquired worldwide distribution rights to Personas Cetaceas, a Spanish language Chilean animated series, originally called Personas Cetaceas. It was renamed Fin Punch, dubbed into English, and hosted on Cartoon Hangover

Sony collaboration
In 2014, Frederator Networks and Sony Pictures Animation announced their new joint project, GO! Cartoons. Twelve, five-minute, animated shorts were planned to be viewed on Cartoon Hangover in 2016, but the series would eventually premiere on November 7, 2017. One of them will be picked to become an animated series on Cartoon Hangover.

Operating units

Channel Frederator Network
Channel Frederator Network (CFN) is a YouTube multi-channel network focused specifically on animation. They have signed 1,222 YouTube creators. As of October 2017, CFN has over 1 billion monthly views.

Frederator Studios
Frederator Studios is an animation studio run by Fred Seibert, who is largely known as the executive producer of Adventure Time, The Fairly OddParents, and The Powerpuff Girls.

Frederator Digital
Frederator Digital is a subsidiary of Frederator Networks that creates unscripted, informational and scripted programming for streaming on the internet. It is currently producing a series of 107 Facts videos, which can be seen on Channel Frederator, Cartoon Hangover, Cinematica, The Leaderboard, and MicDrop on YouTube

The Leaderboard Network
The Leaderboard Network is a YouTube multi-channel network that focuses exclusively on video games and gaming.  Its main YouTube channel, The Leaderboard, launched in April 2015 and as of 2017 has over 550,000 subscribers with over 90 million views.

Cinematica
The Cinematica Network is a YouTube multi-channel network that focuses exclusively on TV and movies.  Its main YouTube channel, Cinematica, launched in August 2015 and to date has over 22,000 subscribers with over 1.5 million views.

Átomo Network
In February 2016, Frederator Networks partnered with Ánima Estudios to launch the Átomo Network, a multi-channel network exclusively for Spanish speaking YouTube animation channels.

Frederator Shorts filmography

References

External links

 
American animation studios
Companies based in New York City
American companies established in 1997
Entertainment companies based in New York City
Entertainment companies established in 1997
Mass media companies established in 1997
Television production companies of the United States
Wow Unlimited Media
2016 mergers and acquisitions
American subsidiaries of foreign companies